Shantashil Rajyeswar Mitter  (born 1969), known as Rana Mitter, is a British historian and political scientist of Indian origin who specialises in the history of republican China. He is Professor of the History and Politics of Modern China at the Department of Politics and International Relations at Oxford University, formerly director of Oxford's China Centre, and a Fellow and Vice-Master of St Cross College. His 2013 book China’s War with Japan, 1937-1945: The Struggle for Survival (titled Forgotten Ally: China’s War with Japan, 1937-45 for publication in the US), about the Second Sino-Japanese War, was well received by critics.

He is also a regular presenter for Night Waves (now known as "Free Thinking") on BBC Radio 3.

British of Indian heritage, he grew up on the south coast of England, near Brighton. Mitter was educated at Lancing College, and King's College, Cambridge, where he received both his MA and PhD; in 1991 he was elected President of the Cambridge Union. He was also a Kennedy Scholar at Harvard University. On 16 July 2015, he was elected a Fellow of the British Academy (FBA).

He was appointed Officer of the Order of the British Empire (OBE) in the 2019 Birthday Honours for services to education.

Mitter works mainly on the emergence of nationalism in Modern China.

He has published several op-eds for The Guardian on contemporary China politics.

Bibliography

Critical studies, reviews and biography
 
 Review of Out of China: How the Chinese Ended the Era of Western Domination.

References

1969 births
Living people
British historians
Academics of the University of Oxford
Fellows of St Cross College, Oxford
Masters of St Cross College, Oxford
Fellows of the British Academy
British sinologists
Alumni of King's College, Cambridge
BBC Radio 3 presenters
British broadcasters
British writers
Presidents of the Cambridge Union
Officers of the Order of the British Empire
British people of Indian descent
Kennedy Scholarships